The Panasonic Lumix G Vario 14-45mm 3.5-5.6 lens is a standard zoom lens for Micro Four Thirds system cameras.  It was the kit zoom included with Panasonic's Micro Four Thirds bodies, until replaced in early 2010 by the Panasonic Lumix G Vario 14-42mm.  The 14-45mm is still available as a separate purchase.

Unlike the 14-42mm, the 14-45mm has a metal mount and hardware OIS switch.  The front elements extend upon zooming, but do not rotate, allowing consistent use of polarized filters.  The 52mm filter diameter lets a user share common filters with the Panasonic 14-42mm and 45-200mm, but not the 14-140 or 100-300mm.

The lens received good reviews compared to typical kit zooms offered by manufacturers, and particularly compared to the cheaper Panasonic 14-42mm.

External links
 LUMIX G VARIO 14-45mm / F3.5-5.6 ASPH. / MEGA O.I.S. (Panasonic Global)
 Two Micro Four Thirds System Lenses by Panasonic Two Micro Four Thirds System Lenses by Panasonic: Digital Photography Review (Sep 2008)

References

14-045
Camera lenses introduced in 2008